A Giger Bar is a bar themed and modelled by the Swiss artist H. R. Giger. There are two Giger Bars: the first, the H.R. Giger Bar in Chur, Switzerland, which opened in 1992, and the second is The Museum HR Giger Bar, located in Château St. Germain, Gruyères, Switzerland, which opened on April 12, 2003. 

The interior of the bars are themed along the lines of his biomechanical style as shown in the Alien films. The roof, walls, fittings and chairs are all modelled by the artist and fit into the same designs as seen in the films he designed, notably "Alien". The prominent high-backed Harkonnen Chair design was originally intended as a Harkonnen throne for an abandoned Dune film project.

In 2013, the founder of the Sci-Fi Hotel chain, Andy Davies, partnered with artist Giger to establish the Giger Bar brand in the United States as part of the company's development plans.

References 

Drinking establishments in Europe
Food and drink companies of Switzerland
H. R. Giger
Bars (establishments)